Töv ("central") is one of the 21 aimags (provinces) of Mongolia. The national capital Ulaanbaatar is located roughly at its center, but the city itself is administrated as an independent municipality.

Geography 
The Aimag includes the western part of the Khentii Mountains, the mountains around the capital, as well as rolling steppe in the south and west.
The most interesting body of water is the Tuul River, which crosses Ulaanbaatar and later joins the Orkhon River.

Population 
The Töv aimag is populated primarily by Khalkha Mongols, major minority group of Kazakhs declined at intercensal period of massive out migration to the Kazakhstan, rest of minority groups grew off in migrations.

Traffic 
The central traffic node is the enclave Ulaanbaatar. The city includes the largest station of the Trans-Mongolian Railway and the Buyant-Ukhaa International Airport.
A small airport with an unpaved runway also exists in the aimag capital Zuunmod.

Culture 
Manzushir Monastery is located near Zuunmod in the Bogd Khan Mountain  national park.
It was founded in 1733 and used to be the home of 20 temples and 300 monks.  Most of it was destroyed by the communists, yet the last temple was restored after democratisation and hosts a small museum today.

National parks 
The Gorkhi-Terelj National Park was founded in 1993. It covers a part of the Khentii Mountains.  It is most well known for its spectacular rock formations, including a rock that looks like a giant turtle from the right perspective.  The landscape has an alpine character, with larch and pine forests, sparkling mountain rivers, and very diverse flora and fauna.

In Khustain Nuruu National Park, about 120 km south west of Ulaanbaatar, the original wild horses, Takhi of Mongolia (Przewalski horses) have been released to the wild again in a process first begun in 1993. The project has been quite successful, and has developed into an attraction for both scientists and tourists.

The Gun-Galuut Nature Reserve is a protected area founded in 2003 to conserve globally threatened species and their habitat. The IUCN red-listed species - white-naped crane, hooded crane, Siberian white crane, swan goose and argali-wild mountain sheep and many other species listed in the National Red book of Mongolia are found here.

Because it is considered sacred, the mountain Mount Bogd Khan south of Ulaanbaatar has been a protected area since 1778. During socialism, it was formally established as a national park. This stopped the urban sprawl of the capital on its southern side.

Administrative subdivisions

References 

 
Provinces of Mongolia
States and territories established in 1931
1931 establishments in Mongolia